Darjeeling Hills University is a public state university in Darjeeling, West Bengal, India. The university was established in 2021 under The Greenfield University Act, 2018. It became active with the appointment of the first vice-chancellor (VC), Subiresh Bhattacharya, in November 2021. It offers education in Nepali, English, History, Political Science, Mass Communication, and Mathematics. In September 2022, followed Bhattacharya arrest, Om Prakash Mishra was appointed interim VC.

References

External links

Universities and colleges in Darjeeling district
Universities and colleges in West Bengal
Educational institutions established in 2021
Darjeeling district
2021 establishments in West Bengal